Anderson Downtown Historic District is a national historic district located at Anderson, Madison County, Indiana. The district dates from c. 1887-1955 and encompasses 32 contributing buildings in the central business district of Anderson. Despite some loss of integrity due to demolition and alteration, the district still includes a significant collection of historic and architecturally distinguished commercial buildings. Aside from the usual historic commercial impact of similar districts, this district includes several properties that illustrate Anderson's transportation heritage. Included in the district or nearby are the following individual sites on the National Register of Historic Places:  Paramount Theatre (Anderson, Indiana), Tower Hotel (Anderson, Indiana), Anderson Bank Building, Gruenewald House, and The Anderson Center for the Arts. Additional notable or interesting buildings include the Union Building, the State Theater, the Central Christian Church, the Anderson YMCA, the old post office and the Big Four.

It was listed in the National Register of Historic Places in 2006.

References

 Anderson: A Pictorial History by Esther Dittlinger, copyright 1991

External links
 City of Anderson Web Site https://web.archive.org/web/20120608221955/http://www.cityofanderson.com/resident-historic_central.aspx
 Anderson Downtown Neighbors Association http://www.adnahome.org/

Historic districts on the National Register of Historic Places in Indiana
Italianate architecture in Indiana
Neoclassical architecture in Indiana
Buildings and structures in Anderson, Indiana
Historic districts in Madison County, Indiana
National Register of Historic Places in Madison County, Indiana